In mathematics and physics, Laplace's equation is a second-order partial differential equation named after Pierre-Simon Laplace, who first studied its properties. This is often written as
 or 
The Laplace operator therefore maps a scalar function to another scalar function.

If the right-hand side is specified as a given function, we have

This is called Poisson's equation, a generalization of Laplace's equation. Laplace's equation and Poisson's equation are the simplest examples of elliptic partial differential equations. Laplace's equation is also a special case of the Helmholtz equation.

The general theory of solutions to Laplace's equation is known as potential theory. The twice continuously differentiable solutions of Laplace's equation are the harmonic functions, which are important in multiple branches of physics, notably electrostatics, gravitation, and fluid dynamics. In the study of heat conduction, the Laplace equation is the steady-state heat equation. In general, Laplace's equation describes situations of equilibrium, or those that do not depend explicitly on time.

Forms in different coordinate systems
In rectangular coordinates,

In cylindrical coordinates,

In spherical coordinates, using the  convention,

More generally, in arbitrary curvilinear coordinates ,

or 

where  is the Euclidean metric tensor relative to the new coordinates and  denotes its Christoffel symbols.

Boundary conditions

Since the Laplace operator appears in the heat equation, one physical interpretation of this problem is as follows: fix the temperature on the boundary of the domain according to the given specification of the boundary condition. Allow heat to flow until a stationary state is reached in which the temperature at each point on the domain doesn't change anymore. The temperature distribution in the interior will then be given by the solution to the corresponding Dirichlet problem.

The Neumann boundary conditions for Laplace's equation specify not the function  itself on the boundary of  but its normal derivative. Physically, this corresponds to the construction of a potential for a vector field whose effect is known at the boundary of  alone. For the example of the heat equation it amounts to prescribing the heat flux through the boundary.

Solutions of Laplace's equation are called harmonic functions; they are all analytic within the domain where the equation is satisfied. If any two functions are solutions to Laplace's equation (or any linear homogeneous differential equation), their sum (or any linear combination) is also a solution. This property, called the principle of superposition, is very useful. For example, solutions to complex problems can be constructed by summing simple solutions.

In two dimensions
Laplace's equation in two independent variables in rectangular coordinates has the form

Analytic functions

The real and imaginary parts of a complex analytic function both satisfy the Laplace equation. That is, if , and if 

then the necessary condition that  be analytic is that  and  be differentiable and that the Cauchy–Riemann equations be satisfied:

It follows that 

Therefore  satisfies the Laplace equation. A similar calculation shows that  also satisfies the Laplace equation. 
Conversely, given a harmonic function, it is the real part of an analytic function,  (at least locally). If a trial form is

then the Cauchy–Riemann equations will be satisfied if we set

This relation does not determine , but only its increments:

and thus  may be defined by a line integral. The integrability condition and Stokes' theorem implies that the value of the line integral connecting two points is independent of the path. The resulting pair of solutions of the Laplace equation are called conjugate harmonic functions. This construction is only valid locally, or provided that the path does not loop around a singularity.

then a corresponding analytic function is

However, the angle  is single-valued only in a region that does not enclose the origin.

The close connection between the Laplace equation and analytic functions implies that any solution of the Laplace equation has derivatives of all orders, and can be expanded in a power series, at least inside a circle that does not enclose a singularity. This is in sharp contrast to solutions of the wave equation, which generally have less regularity.

There is an intimate connection between power series and Fourier series. If we expand a function  in a power series inside a circle of radius , this means that

with suitably defined coefficients whose real and imaginary parts are given by 

Therefore

These trigonometric functions can themselves be expanded, using multiple angle formulae.

Fluid flow

Let the quantities  and  be the horizontal and vertical components of the velocity field of a steady incompressible, irrotational flow in two dimensions. The continuity condition for an incompressible flow is that 

and the condition that the flow be irrotational is that

If we define the differential of a function  by

then the continuity condition is the integrability condition for this differential: the resulting function is called the stream function because it is constant along flow lines.

and the irrotationality condition implies that  satisfies the Laplace equation. The Cauchy–Riemann equations imply that

Thus every analytic function corresponds to a steady incompressible, irrotational, inviscid fluid flow in the plane. The real part is the velocity potential, and the imaginary part is the stream function.

Electrostatics
According to Maxwell's equations, an electric field  in two space dimensions that is independent of time satisfies

and

where  is the charge density. The first Maxwell equation is the integrability condition for the differential

so the electric potential  may be constructed to satisfy

The second of Maxwell's equations then implies that 

which is the Poisson equation. The Laplace equation can be used in three-dimensional problems in electrostatics and fluid flow just as in two dimensions.

In three dimensions

Fundamental solution
A fundamental solution of Laplace's equation satisfies

where the Dirac delta function  denotes a unit source concentrated at the point . No function has this property: in fact it is a distribution rather than a function; but it can be thought of as a limit of functions whose integrals over space are unity, and whose support (the region where the function is non-zero) shrinks to a point (see weak solution). It is common to take a different sign convention for this equation than one typically does when defining fundamental solutions. This choice of sign is often convenient to work with because −Δ is a positive operator.

The Laplace equation is unchanged under a rotation of coordinates, and hence we can expect that a fundamental solution may be obtained among solutions that only depend upon the distance  from the source point. If we choose the volume to be a ball of radius  around the source point, then Gauss' divergence theorem implies that

It follows that 

on a sphere of radius  that is centered on the source point, and hence

Note that, with the opposite sign convention (used in physics), this is the potential generated by a point particle, for an inverse-square law force, arising in the solution of Poisson equation. A similar argument shows that in two dimensions

where  denotes the natural logarithm. Note that, with the opposite sign convention, this is the potential generated by a pointlike sink (see point particle), which is the solution of the Euler equations in two-dimensional incompressible flow.

Green's function
A Green's function is a fundamental solution that also satisfies a suitable condition on the boundary  of a volume . For instance, 

may satisfy
 

Now if  is any solution of the Poisson equation in :

For the case of the interior of a sphere of radius , the Green's function may be obtained by means of a reflection : the source point  at distance  from the center of the sphere is reflected along its radial line to a point P that is at a distance

Note that if  is inside the sphere, then P′ will be outside the sphere. The Green's function is then given by

where  denotes the distance to the source point  and  denotes the distance to the reflected point P′. A consequence of this expression for the Green's function is the Poisson integral formula'. Here  denotes the angle with the vertical axis, which is contrary to the usual American mathematical notation, but agrees with standard European and physical practice. Then the solution of the Laplace equation with Dirichlet boundary values  inside the sphere is given by
 
where

This mean value property immediately implies that a non-constant harmonic function cannot assume its maximum value at an interior point.

Laplace's spherical harmonics 

Laplace's equation in spherical coordinates is:

Consider the problem of finding solutions of the form .  By separation of variables, two differential equations result by imposing Laplace's equation:

The second equation can be simplified under the assumption that  has the form . Applying separation of variables again to the second equation gives way to the pair of differential equations

for some number . The solution function  is regular at the poles of the sphere, where . Furthermore, a change of variables  transforms this equation into the Legendre equation, whose solution is a multiple of the associated Legendre polynomial  . Finally, the equation for  has solutions of the form ; requiring the solution to be regular throughout  forces .

Here the solution was assumed to have the special form . These angular solutions are a product of trigonometric functions, here represented as a complex exponential, and associated Legendre polynomials:

which fulfill

For a fixed integer , every solution  of the eigenvalue problem

In fact, for any such solution,  is the expression in spherical coordinates of a homogeneous polynomial that is harmonic (see below), and so counting dimensions shows that there are  linearly independent such polynomials.

The general solution to Laplace's equation in a ball centered at the origin is a linear combination of the spherical harmonic functions multiplied by the appropriate scale factor ,

Such an expansion is valid in the ball

In that case, one needs to expand the solution of known regions in Laurent series (about ), instead of Taylor series (about ), to match the terms and find .

Electrostatics
Let  be the electric field,  be the electric charge density, and  be the permittivity of free space. Then Gauss's law for electricity (Maxwell's first equation) in differential form states

Now, the electric field can be expressed as the negative gradient of the electric potential ,

if the field is irrotational, .

Plugging this relation into Gauss's law, we obtain Poisson's equation for electricity,

In the particular case of a source-free region,  and Poisson's equation reduces to Laplace's equation for the electric potential.

If the electrostatic potential  is specified on the boundary of a region , then it is uniquely determined. If  is surrounded by a conducting material with a specified charge density , and if the total charge  is known, then  is also unique.

A potential that doesn't satisfy Laplace's equation together with the boundary condition is an invalid electrostatic potential.

Gravitation
Let  be the gravitational field,  the mass density, and  the gravitational constant. Then Gauss's law for gravitation in differential form is

The gravitational field is conservative and can therefore be expressed as the negative gradient of the gravitational potential:

Using the differential form of Gauss's law of gravitation, we have

which is Poisson's equation for gravitational fields.

In empty space,  and we have

which is Laplace's equation for gravitational fields.

In the Schwarzschild metric

S. Persides solved the Laplace equation in Schwarzschild spacetime on hypersurfaces of constant .

where  is a spherical harmonic function, and

The parameter  is an arbitrary non-negative integer.

See also
 6-sphere coordinates, a coordinate system under which Laplace's equation becomes R-separable
 Helmholtz equation, a general case of Laplace's equation.
 Spherical harmonic
 Quadrature domains
 Potential theory
 Potential flow
 Bateman transform
 Earnshaw's theorem uses the Laplace equation to show that stable static ferromagnetic suspension is impossible
 Vector Laplacian
 Fundamental solution

Notes

References

Further reading

External links
 
 Laplace Equation (particular solutions and boundary value problems) at EqWorld: The World of Mathematical Equations.
 Example initial-boundary value problems using Laplace's equation from exampleproblems.com.
 
 Find out how boundary value problems governed by Laplace's equation may be solved numerically by boundary element method

Elliptic partial differential equations
Harmonic functions
Equations
Fourier analysis
Equation